Katrine Nysveen  (born 26 November 1973) is a retired Norwegian footballer who played as a defender. She was capped 21 times for the Norway national team. She was part of the team at the 1993 UEFA European Championship. On club level she plays for Setskog/Høland FK and Asker in Norway.

References

1973 births
Living people
Norwegian women's footballers
Norway women's youth international footballers
Norway women's international footballers
Asker Fotball (women) players
Association football defenders
Women's association football defenders